

Events 
 January–March 
 January 3 – A fleet of Spanish ships, commanded by Lorenzo de Zuazola to travel to the Philippines, runs into a violent storm after its departure from Cadiz, with the loss of many lives, including Zuazola. 
 January 7 – Ben Jonson's play News from the New World Discovered in the Moon is given its first performance, a presentation to King James I of England. In addition to dialogue about actual observations made by telescope of the Moon, the play includes a fanciful discussion of a lunar civilization a dance by the "Volatees", the lunar race. 
 January 22 – In France, Charles d'Albert, duc de Luynes and his wife, the Duchess Marie de Rohan, sign a marriage contract on behalf of their one-year-old daughter to be engaged to the year-old son of Charles, Duke of Guise. 
 January 26 – Karan Singh II becomes the new ruler of the Kingdom of Mewar (in what is now the state of Rajasthan in India) upon the death of his father, the Maharana Amar Singh I.
 February 4 – Prince Bethlen Gabor signs a peace treaty with Ferdinand II, Holy Roman Emperor.
 March 22 – King Karma Phuntsok Namgyal of Tibet dies of smallpox after a reign of less than two years, after Ngawang Namgyal of Bhutan casts a tantric spell over him. 
 March 24 – English sailor Owen Fitzpen is captured by Turkish pirates while on a trading voyage in the Mediterranean Sea and sold into slavery. He remains a slave in North Africa for seven years until he and 10 other slaves are able to take over a Turkish ship and sail back to Europe.

 April–June 
 April 1 – Ferdinand II, Holy Roman Emperor and former King of Bohemia, sends a two-month ultimatum directing King Frederick of Bohemia (who had usurped the throne in what is now the Czech Republic) to leave Bohemia by June 1. Frederick refuses to depart his capital at Prague. 
 April 7 – The earliest recorded earthquake in South Africa occurs at Robben Island.
 April 20 – Mian Shahul Mouhammed Kalhoro begins his reign at Karachi as the king of Sindh, in what is now Pakistan, and rules until 1657. 
 May 17 – The first merry-go-round is seen at a fair in Philippapolis, Turkey).
 June 3 – The oldest stone church in French North America, Notre-Dame-des-Anges, is begun at Quebec City in what is now, Canada.

 July–September 
 July 3
 Under the terms of the Treaty of Ulm, the Protestant Union declares neutrality and ceases to support Frederick V of Bohemia.
 Captain Andrew Shilling, on behalf of the English Honourable East India Company, lays claim to Table Bay in Africa.
 July 25 (July 15 OS) – The armed merchant ship Mayflower embarks about 65 emigrants for New England at or near her home port of Rotherhithe on the Thames east of London; about July 29 (July 19 OS) she anchors in Southampton Water.
 August 1 (July 22 OS) – The ship Speedwell departs Delfshaven with English separatist Puritans from Leiden bound to rendezvous with the Mayflower; on August 5 (July 26 OS) she anchors in Southampton Water.
 August 15 (probable date; August 5 OS) – Mayflower and Speedwell depart together from Southampton, but are forced to put back into Dartmouth, Devon, for repairs to a leak in the latter ship on August 22 or 23 (August 12 or 13 OS).
 August 7
 The mother of Johannes Kepler is arrested for witchcraft.
 In a battle at Les Ponts-de-Cé in France, King Louis XIII defeats troops led by his mother, Marie de' Medici.
 September 2 (August 23 OS) – Mayflower and Speedwell depart together from Dartmouth; they are well out into the Atlantic when the Speedwell is again found to be leaking.
 September 7 (August 28 OS)
 Mayflower and Speedwell return again to England, anchoring at Plymouth; the  latter ship is given up as a participant in the voyage and on September 12 (September 2 OS) departs for London with most of her passengers and stores having been transferred to the Mayflower.
 The town of Kokkola was founded by King Gustavus Adolphus of Sweden.Historia - Kokkola (in Finnish)
 September 16 (September 6 OS) – Mayflower departs from Plymouth in England on her third attempt to cross the Atlantic. The Pilgrims on board comprise 41 "saints" (English separatists largely from Holland), 40 "strangers" (largely secular planters from London), 23 servants and hired workers, together with c. 30 crew.
 September 17–October 7 – Battle of Cecora: The Ottoman Empire defeats Polish–Lithuanian Commonwealth–Moldavian troops.

 October–December 
 October 6 – Battle of Amedamit in Gojjam, Ethiopia: The Roman Catholic Ras Sela Kristos, half-brother of Emperor Susenyos, crushes a group of rebels, who were opposed to Susenyos' pro-Catholic beliefs.
 November 3 – The Great Patent is granted to Plymouth Colony.
 November 8 – Thirty Years' War: Battle of White Mountain – Catholic forces are victorious in only two hours near Prague.
 November 21 (November 11 OS) – The Mayflower arrives inside the tip of Cape Cod (named from the Concord voyage of 1602), at what becomes known as Provincetown Harbor, with the Pilgrims and Planters; 41 Plymouth Colony settlers sign the Mayflower Compact, the first governing document of the colony, on board the ship.
 November 25 – The Wedding of Gustav II Adolf and Maria Eleonora takes place.
 December 21 – Plymouth Colony: William Bradford and the Mayflower Pilgrims land on what becomes known as Plymouth Rock, in Plymouth, Massachusetts.

 Date unknown 
 "A Dutch Ship, putting in this Year [of 1620, before June], sold 20 Negroes to the Colony [as slaves], which were the first of that Generation, that were ever brought to Virginia."
 A severe frost in England freezes the River Thames; 13 continuous days of snow blanket Scotland. On Eskdale Moor, only 35 of a flock of 20,000 sheep survive.
 Witch-hunts begin in Scotland.
 History of submarines: Cornelis Drebbel demonstrates the first navigable undersea boat in the Thames in England.
 The modern violin is developed.
 Juan Pablo Bonet, teacher of deaf children in the Spanish court, creates a sign alphabet.
 Francis Bacon publishes the Novum Organum (beyond Aristotle's Organon) on logical thinking.
 A Short Account of the Destruction of the Indies by Bartolomé de las Casas and Origin and progress of the disturbances in the Netherlands by Johannes Gysius is re-published in the Netherlands.
 Shōgun Tokugawa Hidetada restores Osaka Castle. Its modern-day appearance dates from this remodeling.

Ongoing
 The Thirty Years' War (1618–1648) continues (principally on the territory of modern-day Germany).

Births

January–March 
 January 1 
 William Brouncker, 2nd Viscount Brouncker of England (d. 1684)
 Robert Morison, Scottish botanist and taxonomist (d. 1683)
 January 5 – Miklós Zrínyi, Croatian military commander (d. 1664)
 January 9 – Anton Günther I, Count of Schwarzburg-Sondershausen (d. 1666)
 January 17 – Anton Janson, Dutch type founder and printer (d. 1687)
 January 31 – Prince Georg Friedrich of Waldeck, Dutch general and German field marshal (d. 1692)
 February 1 – Gustaf Bonde, Swedish politician (d. 1667)
 February 3 – Sir James Clavering, 1st Baronet, English landowner (d. 1702)
 February 5 – Paul Barbette, Dutch physician (d. 1666)
 February 13 – Girolamo Casanata, Italian cardinal (d. 1700)
 February 15 – François Charpentier, French archaeologist and man of letters (d. 1702)
 February 16 – Frederick William, Elector of Brandenburg (d. 1688)
 February 23 – Francis Newport, 1st Earl of Bradford, English politician (d. 1708)
 March 10 – Johann Heinrich Hottinger, Swiss philologist and theologian (d. 1667)
 March 13 – Alexander Seton, 1st Viscount of Kingston (d. 1691)
 March 29 – Edward Digges, English barrister and colonist, Colonial Governor of Virginia (d. 1674)

April–June 
 April 4 – Bernardino León de la Rocha, Roman Catholic prelate, Bishop of Coria and of Tui (1669–1673) (d. 1675)
 April 15 – Edward Villiers, English politician and military officer (d. 1689)
 April 17 – Marguerite Bourgeoys, French Catholic nun, founder of the Congregation of Notre Dame (d. 1700)
 April 18 – Winston Churchill (1620–1688), English noble, soldier (d. 1688)
 April 21 – Salvatore Castiglione, Italian painter (d. 1676)
 April 24 – John Graunt, English demographer (d. 1674)
 May 3 – Bogusław Radziwiłł, Polish-Lithuanian noble (d. 1669)
 May 21 – Krsto Zmajević, Montenegrin-born Venetian merchant (d. 1688)
 May 23 – Pieter Neefs the Younger, Flemish painter (d. 1675)
 May 25 – Warwick Mohun, 2nd Baron Mohun of Okehampton, English Member of Parliament (d. 1665)
 June 6 – Sir John Covert, 1st Baronet, English politician (d. 1679)
 June 11 – John Moore (Lord Mayor), Member of Parliament for the City of London (d. 1702)

July–September 
 July 20 
 Nikolaes Heinsius the Elder, Dutch scholar (d. 1681)
 Camillo Massimo, Italian cardinal, patron of the arts (d. 1677)
 July 21 – Jean Picard, French astronomer and priest (d. 1682)
 July 31 – Juan Ignacio de la Carrera Yturgoyen, Chilean politician (d. 1682)
 August 6 – William Hiseland, English (later British) soldier, reputed supercentenarian (d. 1732)
 August 19 – Johann Just Winckelmann, German writer and historian (d. 1699)
 August 22 – Alexander Rigby (died 1694), English politician (d. 1694)
 August 24 – Thomas Stucley (MP), English politician (d. 1663)
 August 26 – Ernst Bogislaw von Croÿ, German Lutheran administrator (d. 1684)
 September 4 – Ernest Gottlieb, Prince of Anhalt-Plötzkau (d. 1654)
 September 6 – Isabella Leonarda, Italian composer (d. 1704)
 September 18 – Albert II, Margrave of Brandenburg-Ansbach, German prince (d. 1667)
 September 25 – François Bernier, French physician and traveller (d. 1688)
 September 29 – John Louis of Elderen, Bishop of Liege (d. 1694)

October–December 
 October 1 – Nicolaes Pieterszoon Berchem, Dutch Golden Age painter of pastoral landscapes (d. 1683)
 October 4 – François-Henri Salomon de Virelade, French lawyer (d. 1670)
 October 15 – William Borlase (died 1665), English politician (d. 1665)
 October 16 – Pierre Paul Puget, French painter (d. 1694)
 October 20 – Aelbert Cuyp, Dutch painter (d. 1691)
 October 27 – Philip Louis, Duke of Schleswig-Holstein-Sonderburg-Wiesenburg (d. 1689)
 October 31 – John Evelyn, English diarist and writer (d. 1706)
 November 10 
 Ninon de l'Enclos, French author (d. 1705)
 Theodoor Boeyermans, Flemish Baroque painter (d. 1678)
  November 20 – Peregrine White, first child born to English settlers at Plymouth Colony (d. 1704)
 December 17 
 Henri Charles de La Trémoille, son of Henry de La Trémoille (d. 1672)
 Maurice of the Palatinate, 4th son of Frederick V, Elector Palatine (d. 1652)
 December 18 – Heinrich Roth, German Jesuit missionary, pioneering Sanskrit scholar (d. 1668)
 December 23 – Johann Jakob Wepfer, Swiss pathologist (d. 1695)

probable – Ecaterina Cercheza, princess consort of Moldavia (d. 1666)

Deaths

January–March 
 January 23 – John Croke, English politician and judge (b. 1553)
 January 26 – Amar Singh I, ruler of Mewar (b. 1559)
 January 28 – Archduchess Eleanor of Austria (b. 1582)
 February 15 – James Archer, Irish Jesuit; played a controversial role in the Nine Years' War (b. 1550)
 February 19
 Al-Mansur al-Qasim, Imam of Yemen (b. 1559)
 Roemer Visscher, Dutch writer (b. 1547)
 February 23 – Nicholas Fuller, English politician (b. 1543)
 March 1 – Thomas Campion, English poet and composer (b. 1567)
 March 5 – Giovanni Francesco Sagredo, Italian mathematician (b. 1571)
 March 17 – St. John Sarkander, Moravian priest (injuries caused by torturing) (b. 1576)
 March 25 – Johannes Nucius, German composer (b. c. 1556)
 March 29 – Hachisuka Yoshishige, Japanese daimyō of the Edo period (b. 1586)

April–June 
 April 8 – Angelo Rocca, Italian humanist (b. 1545)
 April 23 – Hayyim ben Joseph Vital, Palestinian-born Kabbalist (b. 1543)
 April 14 – Rascas de Bagarris, French scholar (b. 1562)
 May 16 – William Adams, English navigator and samurai (b. 1564)
 May 30 – Mathias Hovius, Roman Catholic archbishop (b. 1542)
 June 17 – Mikołaj Zebrzydowski (b. 1553)

July–September 
 July 13 – William Louis, Count of Nassau-Dillenburg (b. 1560)
 August 2 – Carolus Luython, Belgian composer (b. 1557)
 August 14 – Katherine Hastings, Countess of Huntingdon, wife of Henry Hastings, 3rd Earl of Huntingdon (b. 1540)
 August 18 – Wanli Emperor, of China (b. 1563)
 September 13 – Wolfgang Hirschbach, German legal scholar (b. 1570)
 September 26 – Taichang Emperor, fourteenth emperor of the Ming dynasty of China (b. 1582)
 September – Sidonia von Borcke, German noble and alleged witch (b. 1548)

October–December 
 October 7 – Stanisław Żółkiewski, Polish nobleman of the Lubicz coat of arms (b. 1547)
 November 6 – Philip III, Margrave of Baden-Rodemachern (1588–1620) (b. 1567)
 November 7 – Robert Hesketh, English politician (b. 1560)
 November 9 – Louise de Coligny, daughter of Gaspard II de Coligny; fourth and last spouse of William the Silent (b. 1555)
 November 11 – Isaac and Josias Habrecht, Swiss watchmaking brothers (b. 1544)
 November 27 – Francis, Duke of Pomerania-Stettin, Bishop of Cammin (b. 1577)
 December 3 – Janusz Radziwiłł, Polish noble (b. 1579)
 December 21 – George Fleetwood, English politician (b. 1564)

Date unknown 
 Rose of Turaida, legendary Latvian murder victim (b. 1601)
 John Flower, English politician (b. 1535)

Approximate date 
 Brianda Pereira, Azorean Portuguese heroine (b. 1550)
 Isabella Parasole, Italian artist (b. ca. 1570)

References 

 
Leap years in the Gregorian calendar